Shuma-Gorath is a fictional character appearing in American comic books published by Marvel Comics.

Publication history
Shuma-Gorath first appears as an adversary for Doctor Strange in Marvel Premiere #10 (September 1973), created by writer Steve Englehart and artist Frank Brunner. The character's name is taken from Robert E. Howard's short story "The Curse of the Golden Skull", which features a dying magician named Rotath invoking the "iron-bound books of Shuma-Gorath" in a curse against humanity.

Heroic Signatures holds the rights to the Shuma-Gorath name, due to its use in Howard's story, along with additional elements related to the Conan the Barbarian and Kull of Atlantis mythos, which is licensed to Marvel Comics.

Fictional character biography
During Earth's pre-history Shuma-Gorath ruled the world, and demanded human sacrifice until eventually banished by time-traveling sorcerer Sise-Neg. The entity eventually returns during the Hyborian Age, but is imprisoned within a mountain by the power of the god Crom. Shuma-Gorath continues to be an influence on Earth until it was returned to its home dimension by Crom.

When the entity tries to return to Earth via the mind of the Ancient One, his disciple Doctor Strange is forced to kill him to prevent this. Years later, Strange battles Shuma-Gorath in its home dimension, and although victorious, he gradually becomes a new version of the entity. Strange commits suicide to prevent this transformation and is resurrected by an ally. Sorcerer Nicholas Scratch summons the entity to Earth, but it is driven back by the combined efforts of Doctor Strange, the Fantastic Four, the Salem's Seven and villain Diablo.

Shuma-Gorath is eventually revealed to be one of the four undying extra-dimensional "multi-angled ones" guiding a metaphysical invasion from a dimension called the "cancerverse". In attempting to destroy Death itself, the entity and its allies are rendered inert by the conceptual form of Death and subsequently are trapped in the cancerverse when it is destroyed. Shuma-Gorath survives and once again attempts to invade Earth but is repelled by the superhero team the Avengers with the Spear of Destiny.

During the 2011 "Fear Itself" storyline, Shuma-Gorath is among the demons to meet at the Devil's Advocacy to discuss the threat of the Serpent and what this means to them.

During the 2013 "Infinity" storyline, Thanos' servant Ebony Maw manipulates Doctor Strange into summoning Shuma-Gorath to the streets of New York. The creature is met by Luke Cage and his new team of Avengers. Blue Marvel arrives at the scene of the battle and flies through Shuma-Gorath's head, destroying its physical manifestation. Shuma-Gorath's astral body possesses a crowd of people in New York City and attempts to recreate itself on Earth. It is weakened through mystical attacks by Power Man and White Tiger and finally banished by Monica Rambeau, who penetrates Shuma-Gorath's eye as a ray of light and disperses the entity from within.

The Last Days of Magic storyline describes Shuma-Gorath as responsible for destroying the home planet of the character Imperator, leader of the Empirikul, by sending a group of evil sorcerers after his family. This leads the Imperator to dedicate his life to destroying magic in every universe.

Later, during a battle, Dormammu states to Doctor Strange that he helped the Empirikul in finding Shuma-Gorath, who was defeated by the Imperator. Doctor Strange later banishes Dormammu to Shuma-Gorath itself, who was visibly wounded and seeking revenge.

Powers and abilities
Shuma-Gorath is an ancient force of chaos, the immortal, nigh-invincible, and godlike ruler of nearly a hundred alternate universes, capable of energy projection, shapeshifting, teleportation, levitation, altering reality, and sympathetic magic, among many other feats. He is described as being vastly more powerful than other mighty demonic enemies, such as Satannish and Mephisto, and is capable of automatically destroying multiple galaxies through aura-pressure alone.

Other versions 
In the "Venomized" event, a Poison Shuma-Gorath was present in the Poison Hive's invasion of the Prime Marvel Universe, fighting Vision and Falcon, successfully bonding a symbiote to the latter.

In other media

Film 
A creature based on Shuma-Gorath, renamed Gargantos after another green, one-eyed octopus monster from Marvel's Sub-Mariner comics due to rights issues with owner Heroic Signatures, appears in the Marvel Cinematic Universe film Doctor Strange in the Multiverse of Madness (2022). This version is a creation of Wanda Maximoff, with the purpose of capturing America Chavez so the former can use her powers for her own, before it is killed in battle by Doctor Strange.

Video games
 Shuma-Gorath appears as a playable character in Marvel Super Heroes, voiced by Frank Perry.
 Shuma-Gorath appears as a playable character in Marvel Super Heroes vs. Street Fighter, voiced again by Frank Perry.
 Shuma-Gorath appears as a playable character in Marvel vs. Capcom 2: New Age of Heroes, voiced again by Frank Perry.
 Shuma-Gorath appears as an unlockable playable character through DLC in Marvel vs. Capcom 3: Fate of Two Worlds and Ultimate Marvel vs. Capcom 3, voiced by Paul Dobson.
 Shuma-Gorath is featured in the Doctor Strange virtual pinball game for Pinball FX 2.

Roleplaying games
Shuma-Gorath is described as an ancient being that predated humanity, and possibly predated the Earth, in the Conan RPG.

See also
 Shub-Niggurath

References

External links
 Shuma-Gorath at Marvel.com
 
 

Characters created by Steve Englehart
Comics characters introduced in 1972
Fictional demons and devils
Fictional monsters
Marvel Comics characters who have mental powers
Marvel Comics demons
Marvel Comics supervillains